How's Your News? is an American television series and also a feature film.  It aired Sundays on MTV in the United States, and the feature film based on the same concept was released in 2003.  It stars a group of reporters with developmental disabilities who interview celebrities and politicians. It is the continuation of a documentary film project started in 1999 by Arthur Bradford at Camp Jabberwocky in Martha's Vineyard, which was made into a movie of the same name and shown on HBO in 2003. South Park creators Trey Parker and Matt Stone serve as the show's executive producers. Season One had a total of 6 episodes.

According to the How's Your News? website on April 9, 2009, the show has not been renewed for a second season on MTV, stating:

"The decision had little to do with the quality of the series, which was one of the most enthusiastically received and best reviewed programs on mtv this year.  It’s just a tough financial time and mtv needed to keep pushing for higher ratings with other shows.  Also, we always knew that our series was an unusual fit for their style of programming.  We’re not “The Hills” or “America’s Next Best Dance Crew” after all…"

After completing the feature film for HBO, the concept was pitched to the Trio network, who subsequently backed the short film "On the Campaign Trail", about the How's Your News? teams trip to both the Democratic and Republican conventions in 2004.  The half-hour film was broadcast on Trio and Channel Four England and featured candid interviews with Hillary Clinton, John McCain, Andre 3000, Ben Affleck, Howard Dean, Michael Moore and Newt Gingrich, amongst others.  Although it was rarely seen, this half-hour documentary was well reviewed and helped convince MTV of the viability of the concept as mainstream TV series.  They funded a pilot in 2006.

In 2012 How's Your News visited both the Republican and Democratic conventions again with support from Matt Stone, and released an hour long documentary special.

Cast
 Jeremy Vest
 Susan Harrington
 Robert "Bobby" Bird
 Sean Costello
 Larry Perry
 Lucas Wahl
 Brendan "B-Money" Lemieux

Episodes
Season One
 Los Angeles, CA
 Las Vegas, NV
 Austin, TX
 New Orleans, LA
 Louisville, KY
 New York, NY

Reviews
 Tom Shales, "Disabled Get Last Laugh on MTV's 'News'", Washington Post
 Cristina Kinon, "MTV show has 'How's Your News?'-worthy premise", New York Daily News
 Roger Catlin, "MTV's Asks: 'How's Your News?'", Hartford Courant
 Xeni Jardin, "BB Video: How's Your News? Comedy/News by Disabled People, Produced by South Park's Matt + Trey", BoingBoing.net

References

External links
 MTV Press release: MTV UNVEILS UNIQUE DOCU-COMEDY SERIES "HOW'S YOUR NEWS?"
 Episodes Online
 
 
 
 

2000s American documentary television series
2000s American political television series
2009 American television series debuts
2009 American television series endings
Infotainment
MTV original programming
Works by Trey Parker and Matt Stone